The House of the Worm is a collection of stories by American writer Gary Myers.  It was published in 1975 by Arkham House in an edition of 4,144 copies and was the author's first book.  The book is a close stylistic pastiche of H. P. Lovecraft and Lord Dunsany, and is effectively an expansion of Lovecraft's Dream Cycle. While presented by the publisher as if a novel of the Cthulhu Mythos, it is, in fact, a collection of linked stories.

The first of these stories, "The House of the Worm", was included (as "The Feast in the House of the Worm") in Lin Carter's anthology New Worlds for Old (1971), the thirty-fifth volume in the Ballantine Adult Fantasy series.  All ten stories were included in Myers's 2013 collection, The Country of the Worm.

Contents 
 "Introduction"
 I "The House of the Worm"
 II "Yohk the Necromancer"
 III "Xiurhn"
 IV "Passing of a Dreamer"
 V "The Return of Zhosph"
 VI "The Three Enchantments"
 VII "Hazuth-Kleg"
 VIII "The Loot of Golthoth"
 IX "The Four Sealed Jars"
 X "The Maker of Gods"

References 

 
 
 
 
 

1975 short story collections
Fantasy short stories
Horror short story collections
Cthulhu Mythos short stories
Arkham House books